William Leitch (1895–1963) was an Irish footballer who played in the Football League for Bournemouth & Boscombe Athletic and Coventry City.

References

1895 births
1963 deaths
Irish association footballers (before 1923)
Association football midfielders
English Football League players
Port Glasgow Athletic F.C. players
Partick Thistle F.C. players
Lisburn Distillery F.C. players
Coventry City F.C. players
AFC Bournemouth players
Helensburgh F.C. players